Chorrobius is a genus of very small freshwater snails, aquatic gastropod mollusks in the family Cochliopidae.

Species
Species within the genus Chorrobius include:
Chorrobius crassilabrum Hershler, Liu & Landye, 2011

References

 Hershler R., Liu H.-P. & Landye J. J. (2011). "Two new genera and four new species of freshwater cochliopid gastropods (Rissooidea) from northeastern Mexico". Journal of Molluscan Studies 77(1): 8-23. doi:10.1093/mollus/eyq033.

Cochliopidae